Dobu may refer to:
 Dobu (film)
 Dobu Island, in Papua New Guinea, or the people of Dobu
 Dobu language
 2,5-Dimethoxy-4-butylamphetamine